Erjon Bogdani (born 14 April 1977) is an Albanian professional football coach and former player. He is nicknamed "Bogu" or "Er-Bomber".

Regarded as one of the most successful Albanian players of all time, Bogdani began his career at Partizani Tirana in 1994 where he debuted at the age of 16. He left the club in January 1998 to sign with Gençlerbirliği. That summer, Bogdani moved in Croatia to play for Zagreb, before traveling to Italy where he enjoyed the best years of his career.

Bogdani played in the following years in Serie A and B, representing Reggina, Salernitana, Verona, Siena, Chievo, Livorno and Cesena. He became a free agent in May 2013 after his contract with Siena ran out, and retired from the sport in February 2014.

Bogdani has 74 caps for Albania national team, making his debut in 1996 and scoring his first goal three years later. With 18 goals, he is Albania's all-time top goalscorer, overtaking his former teammate Alban Bushi in 2011 by netting his 15th goal. He holds numerous Albanian records, including most goals as substitute and oldest goalscoring in history, and has been dubbed as the best striker to play for the Red and Black.

Following his retirement, Bogdani was initially appointed by Albanian Football Association as a youth talents scouter, starting the job in September 2014. He began his managerial career by being named Gianni De Biasi assistant in August 2015. In December 2016, he was named manager of Albania under-19 team.

Club career

Early years
Bogdani was discovered by local side Partizani Tirana at the age of 10 in a school team competition held in Tirana, where he scored 11 goals in just four games. The young Bogdani then joined Partizani Tirana's academy, where he played through the different age groups and eventually signed his first professional contract with the club in 1994.

Partizani Tirana
Bogdani made his professional debut with Partizani Tirana in the Albanian Superliga, playing seven games in the second half of the 1993–94 season. The following season, he scored his first goal in a campaign which saw him play 13 games and score 2 goals. The 1997–98 campaign would prove to be his most successful in Albanian football as he scored 13 goals in just 15 games before the winter break.

Gençlerbirliği
His performance at Partizani Tirana attracted the attention of several foreign clubs. Bogdani decided to move to Turkey at Gençlerbirliği in the Süper Lig playing for the second half of the 1997–98 season in 11 games and scoring 1 goal.

NK Zagreb
Bogdani later moved to Croatia with Josip Kuže's (also future coach of Bogdani at the Albania national team in 2009) crucial help joining the Prva HNL club NK Zagreb. In his first season with NK Zagreb, the 1998–99, he played 14 games scoring 9 goals. In the next season 1999–2000 first-half, he scored 6 goals in 12 games.

Reggina
With the first half of the 1999–2000 Prva HNL season over, Bogdani was transferred to Italy at the winter break, joining Reggina on a three-year contract in January 2000. He made his Serie A debut on 6 February 2000 against Bologna. Overall in his first season at Reggina he played 10 Serie A games and scored 1 goal. In the 2000–01 season he played 19 matches scoring 1 goal and Reggina were relegated in the Serie B. In the 2001–02 Serie B season, Bogdani managed to score 7 goals in 31 games helping Reggina rank in the 3rd place to win promotion in the Serie A. He played overall 11 games and scored 1 goal in the 2002–03 Serie A. In the 2003–04 season, he was loaned to Salernitana in the Serie B.

Hellas Verona
In the 2004–05 season, Bogdani was signed by Verona. Under coach Massimo Ficcadenti Bogdani played all 38 matches where he participated as a starter completing 33 full 90-minutes and was the team top-scorer in the Serie B with 17 goals scored. He was ranked 4th in the entire goalscorers classification with 3 goals behind top-scorer Gionatha Spinesi and 2 goals behind Diego Milito and Francesco Tavano. The 2004–05 season had the highest number of goals scored in a single season.

Siena
In the summer of 2005, Bogdani made his return to Italy's top-flight, but for A.C. Siena. He made it his debut on 28 August 2005 against Cagliari playing a full 90-minute match, which finished in a 2–1 victory. Bogdani scored his first goal on 21 September 2005 against Ascoli, in a match finished in the 1–1 draw where his goal was the first of the match, scored in the 45th minute.

On 28 January 2006 Bogdani scored a hat trick of 3 goals against Palermo where the match finished in the 1–3 away victory. In the 2005–06 season he registered in total 34 league appearances where he scored in total 11 goals.

He started another season with Siena as he played in the first match against Chievo on 10 September 2006, where the match finished in a victory 1–2. He played until the end of the 2006–07 season's first half, where he made 15 appearances and scored 2 goals.

Chievo Verona
On 11 January 2007 the struggling A.C. ChievoVerona signed 29-year-old Albanian international striker Bogdani from Serie A rivals AC Siena for an undisclosed fee.

With Chievo, he made his debut on 14 January 2007 against Catania playing as a starter. He scored twice on 24 February 2007 against Torino, in a match finished in a 3–0 victory. He established himself as a starter under coach Luigi Delneri playing in the starting lineup in 16 out 19 matches, scoring in total 5 goals but unable to avoid relegation to Serie B.

Loan to Livorno
Bogdani remained in Serie A as he was loaned out to Livorno at the start of the 2007–08 Serie A season to replace the "goal machine" Cristiano Lucarelli. He made his debut with Livorno on 2 September 2007 against Palermo in a match finished in the 2–4 loss, where he came on as a substitute in the 36th minute in place of Francesco Tavano. Bogdani scored two goals during the second-half season, first against Juventus on 27 January 2008 in a 1–3 loss and against Reggina on 19 March 2008 in the match finished in the 1–1 draw. At the end of the season Livorno were relegated to Serie B as they were ranked in the last place of the table. Bogdani registered 28 appearances and only two goals for the entire season.

Return to Chievo
He returned to Chievo for the 2008–09 season. He had a bad season where he wasn't even included in 9 matches and played 12 matches as a starter and 9 as a substitute. He scored only 1 goal for the entire season against Lazio on 15 March 2009 in a match finished in the 0–3 victory, where Bogdani came on as a substitute following an injury of Stephen Makinwa in the 20th minute and scored the opening goal in the 27th minute.

Almost similar was also the next 2009–10 season. He participated in 32 matches playing 12 as a starter and 9 as a substitute where he scored 2 goals and provided 1 assist. On 20 September 2009 against Genoa Bogdani played as a starter and created an immediate impact in the first minutes winning a penalty in the 4th minute converted in goal by Michele Marcolini and scoring a goal himself 2 minutes later. Chievo won by 3–1. Due to a dispute with coach Domenico Di Carlo he was not included in the four penultimate matches of the season.

Cesena
On 22 July 2010, Bogdani signed with newly promoted Serie A side Cesena for an undisclosed fee as a free agent. He signed a contract until the end of the 2010–11 season, with an option of a further season. Bogdani took squad number 70, and made his debut by starting in the goalless draw versus Roma in the opening matchday on 28 August. His first score-sheet contributions came in his second appearance two weeks later in the 2–0 home win over Milan, netting the opener and also setting up Emanuele Giaccherini for the second. He was named "Man of the match" for his performance, and he followed that up by netting the winner versus Lecce the next week. He finished his first season at Cavallucci Marini by scoring 8 goals in 35 league appearances, being the second scorer of the team, only one goal less than Luis Jiménez. It was his highest tally since the 2005–06 season.

Bogdani lost his place in the next season, being reduced to playing only at cup games. He scored his first goal of the season on 21 August in the third round match of Coppa Italia's Section 8, the winner versus Ascoli in the 119th minute, having come on as a substitute in the 106th minute. Bogdani's second goal came in the next cup match versus Gubbio, netting the opener with a penalty kick in a 3–0 home win, which allowed Cesena to progress to round of 16. After being used very scarcely in league during the first part of the season, he left the club in January 2012 during the winter transfer window.

Return to Siena
Bogdani returned to AC Siena by signing a two-year contract on the final day of the winter transfer window. He made his debut with the Tuscans 22 February 2012, in the home defeat against Catania. He scored his first goal in the league 26 February 2012 in the 4–1 win against Palermo. He scored again in the next two weeks against Cagliari and Cesena, his former team. Bogdani concluded the season with 11 appearances and 4 goals.

The following season he began by playing from the first minute in Siena-Vicenza (4–2), valid for the third round of the Italian Cup, going out to 33 of recovery instead of Michele Paolucci. He made his debut in the league on 26 August against Torino (0–0), scored his first goal of the season on 31 October in Cagliari-Siena (4–2). Bogdani scored his second goal against Sampdoria on 20 January 2013. He came on as a substitute to score in the 63rd minute, the only goal of the match which gave Siena the 1–0 victory.

After his contract with Siena expired at the end of the season, Bogdani didn't move to any club in the 2013 summer transfer window. On 11 February 2014 Bogdani confirmed to have retired from football.

International career

Youth
Under-21
Bogdani first became part of the Albania U21 team in 1996, where he scored on his official debut in a 1998 UEFA European Under-21 Football Championship qualification match against Portugal on 9 October 1996. Following his goal however, he was sent off after receiving the first red card of his career just 4 minutes after scoring his first international goal and Albania went on to lose the game 4–2. Overall he made 7 official appearances and scored 1 goal as Albania finished Group 9 in 5th place.

Under-23
Bogdani was called up to Albania under-23 by coach Sulejman Mema to participate in the 1997 Mediterranean Games football tournament, which began on 8 June in Southern Italy. Albania U23 were shorted in Group B among Yugoslavia and Italy. Bogdani played as a half-time substitute for Mahir Halili against Yugoslavia U23 and scored in the 60th minute the only Albania U23's goal in a 4–1 loss. In the second fixture against Italy U23 he was an unused substitute.

Senior

1996–03: Beginnings
Bogdani was first introduced to the Albania senior squad by manager Neptun Bajko in April 1996 for the friendly match versus Bosnia and Herzegovina. He came on in the last minutes as a substitute with the match ending in a goalless draw. Later that year, in December, Bogdani was called up again for the 1998 FIFA World Cup qualification match against Northern Ireland in which Bogdani was an unused substitute. Albania lost 2–0 at Windsor Park. His second appearance came two years later in another friendly versus Cyprus on 19 August 1998 where he again came on as a substitute.

Bogdani scored his first international goal on 10 February 1999 in the 2–0 friendly win over Macedonia. He continued to be part of the team under Astrit Hafizi management in the UEFA Euro 2000 qualifying, where Albania was placed in Group 2. He made 6 appearances during the qualifying phase, including one as starter, as Albania finished the group in 5th place with 7 points.

Bogdani didn't find more space in the next qualifying campaign, the 2002 FIFA World Cup qualification, in which he managed to play only four matches. He was not seen as starter by manager Medin Zhega before players such as Igli Tare, Alban Bushi and Altin Rraklli. He scored his next international goals in form of a brace in the 3–0 home win over Malta on 15 November 2000.

2004–05: Injury and return as protagonist
Bogdani missed out almost the entire UEFA Euro 2004 qualifying due to injury suffered at club level, participating only one time on 7 June 2003 against Republic of Ireland where he was an unused substitute under coach Hans-Peter Briegel.

Having been out of the team for more than 18 months, Bogdani returned in February 2005 for the matchday 5 of 2006 FIFA World Cup qualification campaign against Ukraine in which he appeared as a second-half substitute for fellow striker Tare. Then he was put as starter in the next matches after a good run on club level, notably scoring in the loss to Denmark and win versus Kazakhstan. Then he scored a brace in the 2–2 draw versus Ukraine in the penultimate qualifying match which gave him four for the campaign, making him top goalscorer of the team, as Albania finished Group 2 at 5th place, leaving behind Georgia and Kazakhstan.

2006–09: Half-century caps and double-figures goals

Bogdani continued to lead Albania's attacking force in the UEFA Euro 2008 qualifying, playing 11 matches, all of them as starter, and was along with Altin Haxhi the most used player. He scored only once during the qualifiers, the temporary equalizer in an eventual 4–2 home defeat to Belarus on 17 November 2007 in the penultimate matchday of Group G. Albania failed once again to qualify at a major tournament as they finished Group G in 5th position with 11 points from 12 matches.

Bogdani played his first 2010 FIFA World Cup qualification match by scoring the opener against Malta, his 9th international goal, in an eventual 3–0 win at Qemal Stafa Stadium in the second match of Group 1. Later on 6 June 2009, Bogdani scored his 10th international goal against Portugal, becoming only the fifth player to achieve the feat. His goal however was only the temporary equalizer the minute after Portugal's opener, as Albania lost 1–2 at injury time. Bogdani made his 50th international appearance in the friendly versus Cyprus in August 2009, netting the third goal in a 6–1 home win which was Albania's largest ever victory. With this goal he overtook Igli Tare and Sokol Kushta to become Albania's 4th goalscorer of all time. Bogdani scored his next goal in the next qualifying match against Denmark to give Albania a 1–1 draw. It was the first time that Bogdani had scored in three consecutive matches. Albania finished Group 1 in 5th place with only 7 points and 6 goals scored, with Bogdani netting half of them.

2010–11: Albania top scorer, UEFA Euro 2012 qualifying
Bogdani began his UEFA Euro 2012 qualifying by playing as a starter in the opening Group D match versus Romania as Albania drew 1–1 at Stadionul Ceahlăul. It was also Albania's first draw versus Tricolorii since 1949 after 9 consecutive defeats. On 9 February 2011, Bogdani played in the 1–2 friendly loss to Slovenia, entering in Albania's top 10 appearance maker list. Later on 26 March 2011, Bogdani assisted Hamdi Salihi's winner against Belarus with a header to give Albania the 1–0 win at Qemal Stafa Stadium, the first ever against them. It was also Bogdani's 60 international appearance, overtaking Rudi Vata in the process.

Bogdani scored his first goal in the qualifiers on 2 September 2011 against the FIFA World Cup-winners France. With this goal Bogdani leveled Alban Bushi to become joint all-time top goalscorer of Albania with 14 goals. He broke the record four days later in the next qualifying match, a 2–1 away loss versus Luxembourg. In the post-match interview, Bogdani stated that he was considering retirement from the national team but changed his mind following a conversation with the Albanian Football Association president Armand Duka declaring that he will stay for another qualification campaign if the Albania national team needs him and of course if he would be in a good running form. He also described 2011 as one of the best years of his career.

2012–13: Final years under De Biasi
Now a veteran, Bogdani continued to be a part of the national team even after the appointment of manager Gianni De Biasi, who was known for having a liking for youth players. He scored his first goal under De Biasi on 22 May 2012, his 16th with a penalty, in a 2–1 friendly win over Qatar at Campo de Fútbol de Vallecas.

For the 2014 FIFA World Cup qualifiers, De Biasi had introduced young forwards into the team to create more competition for the starting eleven. Young forwards such as Edgar Çani, Armando Sadiku and Bekim Balaj provided competition for the established and mature internationals which were Bogdani and Hamdi Salihi. He played as a substitute in the opening Group E match versus Cyprus, entering at 72nd minute in place of Emiljano Vila, only to fire a 30-yard strike into the net in the 87th minute to secure a 3–1 win, a goal which many considered to be the best international goal of his career. It was his 69th match for Albania, which made him the fifth player with most appearances, overtaking Igli Tare and Alban Bushi. He started in the second match against Switzerland but was replaced in the 55th minute as Albania lost 0–2.

Bogdani begun 2013 by netting his 18th international goal, a first-half header, in the friendly loss against Georgia on 6 February. He played as a late substitute in the qualifying match versus Norway as Albania took their first ever win versus them thanks to Hamdi Salihi's winner. This proved to be his last competitive match. Bogdani captained Albania for the first time in his career four days later in the friendly match against Lithuania in his 74th international appearance, playing for 70 minutes before making place for Lorik Cana.

Retirement
On 11 February 2014, Bogdani confirmed to have retired from the played football, thus ending his 17-year international career. At the time, he was Albania's fourth player with most appearances. He is currently the top goalscorer with 18 goals. He also hold records for most goals scored for Albania at FIFA World Cup qualification (8), and most goals scored as a substitute (4). In addition, Bogdani is also the oldest player at 35 years, 10 month, 23 days to score a goal for Albania.

Managerial career

Albania national team
Principally Bogdani started working as youth talents Scouter at Albania national football team, where he was named on 12 August 2014 by FSHF.

On 29 August 2015, he was named as the Albania national team assistant manager by the national head coach Gianni De Biasi for replacing the departed Altin Lala.

Albania under-19
Following naming of Paolo Tramezzani fellow assistant manager of De Biasi at Albania national team as a National teams director, on 9 December 2016 Bogdani was named as the Albania national under-19 football team manager.

In February 2017 he had his first gathering with Albania U19 where he participated in the Roma Caput Mundi Tournament developed from 27 February–3 March 2017. He won its first ever tournament which he participated, beating Romania U19 2–0 in the Final. Prior the Final he did won the opening match against Malta U19 2–1, winning then by 2–0 against England national under-19 team of high-schools and beating Italy national under-19 team of Diletanti 4–2 by Penalty shoot-out. During this tournament, did caught attention a young talent Sadik Çela of PAOK under-20 who scored 3 goals.

Career statistics

Club

International

International goals
. Albania score listed first, score column indicates score after each Bogdani's goal.

Honours

Club
Partizani Tirana
Albanian Cup (1): 1996–97

Reggina
Serie A Promotion (1): 2001–02

Individual
Serie A Man of the Match with Cesena (6)
Serie A Team of the Week with Cesena (4): 2010
Albanian Footballer of the Year (1): 2005
Albanian Fan's Footballer of the Year (3): 2002, 2005, 2007

References

External links
 
 
 
 Erjon Bogdani at La Gazzetta  
 
 
 
 Erjon Bogdani at FSHF.org

1977 births
Living people
Albanian Roman Catholics
Footballers from Tirana
Albanian footballers
Association football forwards
FK Partizani Tirana players
Gençlerbirliği S.K. footballers
NK Zagreb players
Reggina 1914 players
U.S. Salernitana 1919 players
Hellas Verona F.C. players
A.C.N. Siena 1904 players
A.C. ChievoVerona players
U.S. Livorno 1915 players
A.C. Cesena players
Kategoria Superiore players
Süper Lig players
Serie A players
Serie B players
Croatian Football League players
Albania youth international footballers
Albania under-21 international footballers
Albania international footballers
Competitors at the 1997 Mediterranean Games
Albanian expatriate footballers
Albanian expatriate sportspeople in Turkey
Albanian expatriate sportspeople in Croatia
Albanian expatriate sportspeople in Italy
Expatriate footballers in Turkey
Expatriate footballers in Croatia
Expatriate footballers in Italy
Mediterranean Games competitors for Albania